Marinello is a French (for a sailor, from the Old French word Marin) and Italian surname. Notable people with the surname include:

Beatriz Marinello (born 1964), Chilean-American chess player and chess official
Kathryn V. Marinello (born 1956), American businesswoman
Juan Marinello (1898–1977), Cuban communist intellectual and writer
Peter Marinello (born 1950), Scottish former footballer
Sandra Marinello (born 1983), German badminton player 
Vince Marinello (1938/39–2020), American sportscaster

See also
Marin
Marinello Schools of Beauty

Surnames
Occupational surnames